Streptomyces ziwulingensis is a bacterium species from the genus of Streptomyces which has been isolated from grassland soil from Ziwuling at the Loess Plateau in China.

See also 
 List of Streptomyces species

References

External links
Type strain of Streptomyces ziwulingensis at BacDive -  the Bacterial Diversity Metadatabase

Further reading 
 

ziwulingensis
Bacteria described in 2013